Sir Arthur Conan Doyle's Sherlock Holmes may refer to:

Sherlock Holmes (1965 TV series), a British television series starring Peter Cushing
Sherlock Holmes (2010 film), a 2010 British-American steampunk mystery film